Portugal competed at the 1988 Winter Olympics in Calgary, Canada.  It was the first time in 36 years that the nation sent athletes to the Winter Games.

A delegation of five competitors participated in one sport - bobsleigh - but no medal was gained.

Competitors
The following is the list of number of competitors in the Games.

Bobsleigh

Officials
 Vasco Lynce (chief of mission)

References

 

Nations at the 1988 Winter Olympics
1988
1988 in Portuguese sport